Berango is a town and municipality located in the province of Biscay, in the region known as "Greater Bilbao" in the autonomous community of Basque Country, Spain with 8,9 km² of extension and a population of 7,195 inhabitants according to the census of the 2019. Its density reaches 174,81 inhabitants per square kilometre.

Geographical Location
Berango is confined by Sopelana in the north, with Urduliz in the northeast, with Erandio in southeast, and with Guetxo 
to the western. In this region there are some cholines that stand out such as Munarrikolanda, Saiherri and Agirremendi mountains. The Gobela river passes through the municipality and disgorges in the Bahía de El Abra. Moreover, Berango receives Larrañazubi's streams and several natural fountains.

References

External links
 BERANGO in the Bernardo Estornés Lasa - Auñamendi Encyclopedia (Euskomedia Fundazioa) 
 Berango's City Hall main page

Municipalities in Biscay

Municipalities in Biscay
Estuary of Bilbao